Castrelo de Miño is a municipality in the Province of Ourense in the Galicia region of north-west Spain. It is a small area and lies in the western part of the province.

References  

Municipalities in the Province of Ourense